WXLM (980 AM) is a commercial AM radio station licensed to Groton, Connecticut, and serving the New London - Groton area.  It broadcasts a talk radio format and is owned by Cumulus Media.  The studios and offices are located on Governor Winthrop Boulevard in New London.

By day, WXLM transmits with 1,000 watts, but to protect other stations on 980 AM at night, WXLM reduces power to 72 watts at sunset.  It uses a non-directional antenna.  The station's transmitter is on Briar Hill Road near Gungywamp Road.

Programming
Most of WXLM's schedule is made up of nationally syndicated shows, largely from co-owned Westwood One.  Weekday mornings start with two news magazines, First Light and America in the Morning.  The rest of the day is made up of conservative talk shows:  Chris Plante, Dan Bongino, Ben Shapiro, Michael Knowles, Mark Levin, Jim Bohannon and Red Eye Radio.

Weekends feature shows on money, health, home repair, technology and real estate.  Weekend hosts include Kim Komando and Bill Cunningham.  Most hours begin with world and national news from Fox News Radio.  Local news updates are provided by the staff at co-owned 630 WPRO.

History
On July 26, 1958, the station signed on the air.  For many years the station's call sign was WSUB.  Groton and New London are noted for their shipbuilding industry, including the construction of SUBmarines.

The station was originally a daytimer, required to go off the air at night.  It was originally owned by Lawrence A. Reilly and James A. Spates.  The original studios were at 119 Bridge Street in Groton.  It had a full service middle of the road (MOR) format of popular adult music, news and sports.

In 1971, it added an FM station at 105.5 MHz, WSUB-FM (now WQGN).  In the 1990s, it got authorization from the Federal Communications Commission to broadcast around the clock, adding low power operation at night.

WSUB-AM-FM were owned by Citadel Broadcasting in the early 2000s.  Citadel merged with Cumulus Media on September 16, 2011.

References

External links

Groton, Connecticut
XLM
Cumulus Media radio stations
News and talk radio stations in the United States
Radio stations established in 1958
1958 establishments in Connecticut